Lockeport is a town and port in Shelburne County, Nova Scotia, Canada. It is a traditional Nova Scotian fishing town, situated on a peninsula in Allendale Bay. It is connected to the mainland by the Crescent Beach causeway. The area that surrounds the bay is known as the "Ragged Islands."

History

In 1762, two families from Massachusetts journeyed to Nova Scotia in an effort to find a new colony that was closer to the rich fishing grounds of the Grand Banks. When they found the sheltered Allendale Bay, they knew they had found a gem in the rough. Situated halfway between the colonies in New England and the fishing grounds, their new town would be a centre for both fishing and trade.

The patriarchs of those first two families, Jonathan Locke and Josiah Churchill, went on to become the captains of industry in the area. Churchill became the first mayor of the Township of Locke's Island (registered in Liverpool in 1764).

Locke's Island and its surroundings entered a period of booming industry, with hotels, trade warehouses and multiple fish plants being constructed. Large trade ships plied the sea lanes from Locke's Island to the West Indies to trade lumber and salt cod, returning to the town laden with molasses and salt. The fishing schooners were constantly returning from the Banks loaded with cod. However, this golden age of the Ragged Islands would eventually come to an end, with the first of many catastrophes coming in the form of a fish market collapse in the 1890s. Subsequent fires plagued the town, and the once great community was brought to its knees. 

In 1907, a meeting was held among the rate-payers of the town. It was obvious to all in attendance that drastic action would need to be taken in order to stimulate the economy of Locke's Island. They decided that the Township of Locke's Island would become the Town of Lockeport. By incorporating as a town, the community was able to receive money from the provincial government.

The money initially received by the town was used to construct a ferry that would link the town with a nearby rail line. This action did succeed in stimulating the declining economy, however, it was unable to restore the town to its former state of glory.

Demographics 

Festivals and culture 
The town is home to a number of annual festivals that promote the heritage and culture of the Ragged Islands area. The Lockeport Sea Derby is a popular, family-oriented festival, which brings members of the community together to share in the area's rich fishing heritage.

The Annual Canada Day festivities are renowned, and imbue a strong sense of local pride in the community.

Lockeport is also host to a popular women's music and arts festival, which celebrates the independence of women on the South Shore, known as Harmony Bazaar Festival of Women & Song.

Sporting history 
Lockeport is one of the most sport-infused communities in Nova Scotia, and perhaps Canada. Since 1950, the local High School has accumulated 44 provincial championships in basketball, soccer and track and field. The town has produced notable athletes including Marjorie Turner-Bailey, a sprinter who represented Canada at the 1976 Summer Olympics in Montreal, Walter Nickerson, the most successful dory-rowing athlete in Canada, and Ian MacMillan, a well-known basketball coach in Nova Scotia who spent time as an assistant coach in the National Basketball Association (NBA). Sporting events still attract large numbers of spectators. Lockeport is host to a number of indoor and outdoor recreational areas where youth continue to gather and play.

Public library 

Located at 35 North Street in Lockeport, the Lillian Benham Library is one of the 10 branches of Western Counties Regional Library. It joined the Western Counties Regional Library on June 5, 1969, but it did not have a physical location in Lockeport until the first branch opened on April 13, 1973. The branch relocated to its present site on September 1, 1981; it then underwent an expansion, re-opening on August 22, 1987.

Further reading
 Tomi Ungerer, Far Out Isn't Far Enough: Life in the Back of Beyond, 1984 (reprinted by Phaidon, 2011)

See also

 List of municipalities in Nova Scotia

References

External links

Town of Lockeport

Communities in Shelburne County, Nova Scotia
Towns in Nova Scotia
General Service Areas in Nova Scotia